Philematium festivum is a species of beetle in the family Cerambycidae. It was described by Fabricius, 1775.

References

Callichromatini
Beetles described in 1775
Taxa named by Johan Christian Fabricius